Stephen Hart Barlow (February 1, 1895 – July 8, 1962) was the Quartermaster General of New Jersey until 1942.

Biography
He was born on February 1, 1895. He was the Quartermaster General of New Jersey from 1934 to 1942.

References

1895 births
1962 deaths
People from Trenton, New Jersey
Quartermasters General of New Jersey